Greg Cordivari (born March 21, 1991) is an American football quarterback from Downingtown, Pennsylvania. He was the starting quarterback for The Catholic University of America's Cardinals football team.

High school career
Cordivari is a class of 2009 Bishop Shanahan High School player. His senior year as quarterback Greg Cordivari passed 224.8 yards per game for the Bishop Shanahan Eagles.

College career 
His first year at Catholic was the 2009 season, when Cordivari played in one game, completing 18-of-35 passes for 222 yards. Long pass was 55 yards. Also rushed twice. In 2010, he was named ODAC Player of the Week (Sept. 12, 2010), appeared in all ten games, completed 195 passes for 2,205 yards and 20 touchdowns, attempted 18 rushes and scored one touchdown. He averaged 220.5 yards passing per game.[3] In 2011 Cordivari entered Catholic's record book, establishing new school records for completions (321) and attempts (505), while also setting the school record for single game completions (46) and attempts (67). Cordivari’s 3,282 passing yards rank second best in school's history, while his 25 touchdown passes and 63.6 completion percentage are third best. He also ecplised the 400 yard mark on two occasions during the season, including a career-high 459 in a win over McDaniel College. He went over 300 yards in seven games and threw multiple touchdowns in every game, but one. Cordivari finished the season ranked seventh nationally in total offense, averaging 315.5 yards per game. At the end of the season, he received the Melberger Award[4] and was named an honorable mention All-American by Beyond Sports College Network (BSN).

References

External links 
Beyond Sports College Network - Member Profile - Greg Cordivari

1991 births
American football quarterbacks
Living people
Catholic University Cardinals football players
Players of American football from Pennsylvania
People from Downingtown, Pennsylvania